Nguyễn Văn Hiến (born October 15, 1954) is a retired Admiral, and former Vice Minister of Defense (Vietnam) from 2009–2016.

Nguyễn Văn Hiến was born on October 15, 1954 at Gia Tan, Gia Vien, Ninh Binh province, Vietnam. He joined the Communist Party of Vietnam on April 26, 1976 (official day on October 26, 1977). He is a member of Central Committee of the Communist Party of Vietnam 11th; Congressman in National Assembly of Vietnam.

In December 5, 2011, he was the only second Vietnamese to be appointed Admiral of Vietnam People's Navy after Admiral Giáp Văn Cương.

Career

In 1973, he passed on Le Quy Don Technical University, courses 8. After one year of study at the Technical University who is achieved excellent results. Ministry of Defence has sent him to study at Missile Academy at Azerbaijan. Returning home, he worked for the navy.

In 1998, he was appointed Commander of Naval Region 4.

In 2000, he was appointed Deputy Commander cum Chief of Staff of the Navy. He was promoted to the rank of rear admiral.

In 2004, he became Commander of the Navy, and he was promoted to the rank of Vice Admiral.

In 2009, he was appointed Deputy Minister of Defense cum Navy Commander.

In 2011, Hiến was promoted to full Admiral.

In August 2015, he left the position of Commander of the Navy, and Rear Admiral Pham Hoai Nam became the new Navy Commander.

In 2016, he retired and left the position of Deputy Minister of Defense.

On 21 May 2020, he was arrested and jailed for 4 years due to fraud during his time in the navy. The Navy's Court expressed he sold three lots of land at Ton Duc Thang street for his own personal gain along with his nephew, who received 20 years in prison.

References

1954 births
Living people
Vietnamese admirals
Vietnamese generals
Members of the 9th Central Committee of the Communist Party of Vietnam
Members of the 10th Central Committee of the Communist Party of Vietnam
People from Ninh Bình province
Members of the National Assembly (Vietnam)